Hans Müller (25 June 1884 in Trier – 19 April 1961 in München) was a German jurist, an administrator and politician, a member of the Freikorps and of the Nazi Party. He was also a member of the CSU.

Müller studied law and economy in Bonn, Freiburg im Breisgau and Munich, and was promoted in 1910 to Dr. jur. et rer. pol.

After the Second World War, Müller joined the CSU, serving from 1946 to 1950 in the Landesvorstand and in the Ministry of Agriculture of Bavaria. From 22 October 1945 to 18 December 1950 he served as Staatsrat and state secretary in the Bavarian State Ministry of Finances under Minister-Presidents Wilhelm Hoegner and Hans Ehard.

After that, he continued his pre-war career, serving from 1 May 1951 to 31 December 1954 as President of the Federal Fiscal Court.

References

External links
 Haus der bayrischen Geschichte

1884 births
1961 deaths
Christian Social Union in Bavaria politicians
University of Bonn alumni
University of Freiburg alumni
Ludwig Maximilian University of Munich alumni
Knights Commander of the Order of Merit of the Federal Republic of Germany